Frank Lloyd (1886-1960), was a British American film director, scriptwriter, producer and actor..

Frank Lloyd may also refer to:
Frank Lloyd (footballer, born 1876) (1876–1945), English footballer for Arsenal and Aston Villa
Frank Lloyd (footballer, born 1928) (1928–2009), English footballer for Bradford City
Frank Lloyd (actor) (1927-1995), Australian-born actor
Frank Eric Lloyd (1909–1992),  Rhodesian author
Frank Lloyd (horn player) (born 1952), English horn player and teacher
Frank Lloyd, English newspaper publishing magnate, son of publisher Edward Lloyd

See also
Francis Lloyd (disambiguation)
Frank Lloyd Wright (1867–1959), American architect